Shah Makdam is a Police Station of Rajshahi District in the Division of Rajshahi, Bangladesh. It is named after Sufi saint Shah Makhdum Rupos.

Geography
It has total area 15 km2.

Demographics
According to the 2011 Bangladesh census, Shah Makdam Thana had 6,892 households and a population of 29,103. 7.5% of the population was under the age of 5. The literacy rate (age 7 and over) was 68.2%, compared to the national average of 51.8%.

Administration
Shah Makdam has 2 wards, 0 Mauzas/Mahallas, and 0 villages.

See also
Upazilas of Bangladesh
Districts of Bangladesh
Divisions of Bangladesh

References

Upazilas of Rajshahi District